The 2020 The Princess Maha Chackri Sirindhorn's Cup "Women's Tour of Thailand" is a women's cycle stage race held in Thailand from 14 to 16 October, 2020. The tour has an UCI rating of 2.2.

The race was won for the second consecutive year by Jutatip Maneephan.

Stages

Classification leadership

References

International cycle races hosted by Thailand
2020 in women's road cycling
2020 in Thai sport